In France, the general duty of coordinating maritime security and survey activities is assumed by seven Centres Régionaux Opérationnels de Surveillance et de Sauvetage (Regional Operating Surveillance and Rescue Centres; French acronym CROSS). This French model is characterized by the polyvalence of these centres. The CROSS assume up to four functional missions, as defined in maritime territory international conventions. The CROSS practice their activities under the operational authority of the Maritime Prefects in mainland France, and Government Representatives for State Action at Sea in Overseas Departments and Territories.

They depend on the Ministry of Ecological Transition . They are managed by the Affaires Maritimes (Maritime Matters Departement) administrators and provided with staff from this Ministry and members from the French Navy.  The watchstanding mission (survey and rescue coordination) is assumed by military officers. They are under the organic authority of the Directions Interregionales des Affaires Maritimes (Interregional Directions of the Maritime Matters / DIRM) on the mainland and the Directions Maritimes on France Overseas Territories, which both are in charge of implementing the public policies about maritime security, protection of the environment, resource managing, maritime activities regulation and teaching.

History 
Before the creation of the CROSS, the sharing of authority about Rescue at Sea in France took place between the French Navy, acting on open sea and the Affaires Maritimes  near the coastal zone. Each district chief was responsible on his littoral portion. From 1960, the nautical leisure activities and the fishery activities developments led to an increase on accidents. The district tools proved to be insufficient, leading to a new reflexion on rescue at sea organization.

It is in this context that is created in 1966 the Centre Régional Operationnel de Défence (Defence Operational Regional Center / CROD) in Lorient, in charge of assuming a support on Search and Rescue operations, on the basis of a unique representative for all participants. This center will become in 1968 the Atlantic Cross and will move to Etel the same year.

Experimental at the origins, the CROSS, whose designation became official in 1967, has been developed on all France coastlines. The total coverage was achieved in 1982 with the creation of Cross-Corsen near Brest after the sinking of Amoco Cadiz  . In the 1990s, the Centres Operationnels de Sauvetage (Save Operational Centres / COS) has been created in overseas territories. First of all, COS Martinique Antilles in 1992 (which became CROSS Antilles-Guyane (French Guyana) in 2001), then the COS La Réunion  in 2004. This network was completed by the MRCC (Maritime Rescue Coordination Centres) of Nouméa (New Caledonia) and the JRCC (Joint Rescue Coordination Centre) of Tahiti French Polynesia which assumes since 2016 both maritime and aerial rescue.

The missions of CROSS

Search and rescue 
A CROSS assumes :

 the reception of alerts by a 24/7 radio and phone watchstanding, including those coming from distress beacon (EPIRB) and satellite communication systems.
 the managing of Search and Rescue operations.

More than 10.000 operations are managed every year by the 7 CROSS for the benefit of fishing boats, commercial boats such as tankers and cargos, yachting and leisure sailing. The CROSS belongs to the network of Maritime Rescue Coordination Centers (MRCC) as defined by the SAR Convention.

Monitoring of sea traffic 
This mission is utmostly important in the English Channel where passes 20% of the world traffic, with an annual rhythm of about 300.000 ships a year. It consists in detecting and identifying the maritime traffic in the zones subjected to very high traffic levels.

The CROSS receives and analyses the mandatory reports send by all ships routing through the English Channel and using one of the three Traffic Separation Scheme off the coast of Ushant / Ouessant, as well as across the Dover Strait. It especially follows the ships carrying potentially polluting or dangerous freight. It follows the ships in order to detect anomalous routes, as well as any behavior which could induce risks for human life or environment. It identifies contraveners to the International Regulations for Preventing Collisions at Sea  (IRPCS / RIPAM). It records the breaches of these rules and transmit them to the judiciary authorities.

Monitoring of pollution 
The CROSS registers informations about marine pollution events. It exploits these informations in order to look for the authors under the judiciary authority control. Under the authority of the Maritime Prefects, it contributes actively to the application of the ORSEC (ORGanisation des SECours) measures of the POLMAR (POLlution MARine) plan to combat accidental marine pollutions.

Monitoring of fishing operations 
The Centre National de Surveillance des Pêches (Fishery Survey National Centre /CNSP), hosted by the CROSS Etel, assumes in real time the operational coordination of a few maritime and aerial tools at disposition. It assumes this mission on account of the DIRM under delegation of the Maritime Prefects. Additionally, the European Union has imposed a satellite survey system of the fishing boats. The CNSP is in charge of this monitoring in the French Waters. It works in close contact with the similar centres of other States Members.

Broadcasting of maritime safety information 
The CROSS broadcasts security informations towards ships :

 In zone A1, using Marine VHF broadcasts for regular forecasts or special meteorological forecasts if wind scales to Near Gale (7 on Beaufort scale)
 In zone A2, using Navetex broadcasts for both of these forecasts or for Avis Urgent pour les Navigateurs (Navigational Warnings / AVURNAV)

Marine Environment Survey 
The Centre d'Appui au Contrôle de l'Environnement Marin (Marine Environment Control Support Centre / CACEM) hosted in the CROSS Etel, assumes a juridical support and expertise for the control units. It receives the control datas coming from his units.

Alert management 
The CROSS Gris-Nez is the national point of entry for attack alerts (piracy, maritime terrorism) which french ships can encounter anywhere in the world.

Locations 
The continental littoral counts six stations:

 CROSS Gris-Nez, in Wissant: Eastern English Channel including Strait of Dover (Pas-de-Calais), from the franco-belgian border to the Cap d'Antifer
 CROSS Jobourg: Central Channel, from Cap d'Antifer to the Mont-Saint-Michel
 CROSS Corsen, in Plouarzel: Western Channel, from Mont-Saint-Michel to Point Penmarc'h
 CROSS Étel: Bay of Biscay, From Point Penmarc'h to the franco-spanish border.
 CROSS La Garde: Mediterranean Sea
 Sous CROSS Corse (aka CROSS-MED) in Ajaccio, a secondary station

Two centres, and five secondary stations and SAR stations are located in the Overseas departments and territories of France:
 CROSS Antilles-Guyane in Fort-de-France: Caribbean Sea
 CROSS de la Réunion: Southern Indian Ocean
 JRCC Polynésie française, in Papeete (Tahiti): Pacific Ocean = fusion des MRCC (Maritime) and ARCC (Air)
 MRCC of French Guiana in Cayenne
 MRCC Nouvelle-Calédonie in Nouméa: Pacific Ocean
 SAR station of Mayotte, Indian Ocean
 SAR station of Saint-Pierre-et-Miquelon: North-western Atlantic Ocean

The CROSS and their specific features

Gris-Nez (Channel East – Strait of Dover / Pas-de-Calais) 
The CROSS Griz-Nez  assumes mainly the survey of maritime traffic in the Traffic Separation Scheme in the Strait of Dover, which french name is Pas-de-Calais, first strait in the world in terms of tonnage.

Moreover, the CROSS Gris-Nez assumes as well an international mission. It is the point of entry for  foreign search and rescue centres and cooperate with the MRCC within the frame work of the GMDSS  (Global Maritime Distress and Safety System)

Jobourg (Channel Central) 
The CROSS Jobourg  position on the tip of the Cotentin Peninsula in the center of the Channel has to deal with maritime navigation survey of the Casquets Traffic Separation Scheme  as well as rescue at sea. It is the reference centre for maritime pollutions. It hosts the managing team of the Maritime Information System.

Corsen (Channel West – Iroise Sea) 
Apart of dealing on coordination of rescue operations on its zone from Mont-Saint-Michel to Point Penmarc'h, CROSS Corsen is in charge of the Ouessant  Traffic Separation Scheme on the tip of Brittany. It is a high density traffic zone where meats the Atlantic Ocean and Channel waters. It has the disposal of important detection radars set up on the Stiff tower on the Ushant island, which is the utmost west point of mainland France.

Etel (Bay of Biscay) 
The responsibility zone of CROSS Etel  spreads from Point Penmarc'h to the Franco-Spanish border. Apart of its polyvalent missions and Search and Rescue activity largely dedicated on yachting, the CROSS Etel hosts the Centre National de Surveillance des Pêches (National Fisheries Survey Centre / CNSP) as well as the Centre d'Appui au Contrôle de l'Environnement marin (Environment Control Support Centre / CACEM).

The CNSP is the unique operational point of entry in charge of sea coordination of aerial and nautical State tools which participates to the sea fisheries survey. Its competence spreads of the french Zone Economique Exclusive (Exclusive Economic Zone / ZEE) in mainland area and has been extended in 2017 to Overseas departements and territories.

La Garde (Méditerranea) 
Main Centre of CROSS Méditerranea, the CROSS Lagarde is situated in the bay of Toulon, and has an important activity of Search and Rescue, dedicated principally on yachting and nautical leisure. It operates on the whole of the Mediterranean zone of French responsibility, with the support, during day time of the CROSS in Corsica.

Corsica 
Situated on the Golfe of Ajaccio in the naval base of Aspretto, it assumes all the missions dedicated to a CROSS on a 20 nautical miles around Corsica, from 9:00 am to 7:00 pm (8:00 am to 10:00 pm in summer). At night time, the CROSS Med in Corsica is decommissioned to the profit of CROSS Lagarde which then assumes the whole french zone of Mediterranea.

Antilles-Guyane (Tropical Atlantic) 
Located in Fort-de-France in the Martinique, the CROSS Antilles-Guyane, deals in a responsibility zone of about 3 millions of km2 about rescue coordination and sea assistance. It deals as well about all the missions to protect environment  and maritime ressources connected with the mainland CROSS.

Réunion (South Indian Océan) 
Situated at Port des Galets in La Réunion, le CROSS Réunion deals since 2004 of all the missions of a CROSS in a  5,6 millions of km² zone.

Nouméa (New-Calédonia and Vanuatu) 
The MRCC of Noumea is in charge of all the missions dedicated to a CROSS. It acts under the responsibility of the Haut Commissaire de la Republique en Nouvelle-Caledonie (Republic High Commissioner in New-Caledonia) and the Maritime Zone Commandant.

Its responsibility zone covers 2,4 millions of km², and includes the Vanuatu archipelago.  In the territorial and internal zones, such as lagoons, the rescue responsibility is given to the New-Caledonia Government since 2011.

Tahiti (French Polynesia) 
Created in 2016 by the merger of the ARCC Faa'a and the MRCC Papeete, the Tahiti JRCC (2) located since 2017 on the municipality of Arue, within the French Polynesia armed forces general quarters.

Under the authority of Republic High Commissioner in French Polynesia,  it assumes five missions : Aerial and maritime search and rescue coordination, fisheries survey, navigation survey, maritime pollution observation, and broadcasting on maritime security informations.

Its responsibility zone covers about 12,5 millions of km². It includes the five French Polynesia archipelago.

The intervention tools 
The CROSS can call on duty all the needed tools to assume their missions.

The French State tools

 patrol ships and speedboats of the Affaires Maritimes,
 ships, planes, helicopters and survey towers (sémaphores)of the French Navy,
 planes, helicopters, diving rescue, and medical staff from the French Air Force,
 speedboats, planes and helicopter of the French Custom,
 speedboats and helicopter of the Gendarmerie Nationale,
 helicopters of the Sécurité Civile.

The speedboats and all weather canots of the Société Nationale de Sauvetage en Mer (National at Sea Rescue Society / SNSM) contributes to more than 40% of search and rescue operations.

The Local communities tools such as firemen, beach lifeguards call be called on duty under the operational controle of the CROSS.

At last, the CROSS can ask for the cooperation of any ship or yacht which is in the distress area.

When the operation needs medical assistance at sea, the CROSS rely on the Centre de Consultation Medicale Maritime de Toulouse (CCMM) and the Service d'Assistance Medicale Universitaire (SAMU and SMUR)

Managing Security Maritime Radio Communications 
The CROSS operates a radiocommunication network covering the maritime areas under operational responsibility :

 70 sites located on the seashore which operates coastal and opensea radio survey.
 4 RADAR on the Channel  for maritime navigation survey as well as AIS antennas

They use 4 satellite networks :

 ARGOS Satellite System for the fisheries survey;
 INMARSAT for communications of the GMDSS
 COSPAS-SARSAT for the safe and rescue
 CLEANSEANET for pollutions survey.

Assigned Frequencies 
The mainland CROSS use principally the VHF marine radio bandwidth (situated between 156,025 MHz and 162,525 MHz in frequence modulation) and marine bandwidth (from 1.605 kHz to 4.000 kHz). For the meteorological forecasts, they use the VHF marine bandwidth and MF bandwidth in the CROSS with Sea area A2 of GMDSS, at precise hours. In case of necessity, they broadcast AVURNAV (Urgent advice to Navigators) or BMS (Special Meteorological Bulletin). The Marine VHF channel 16, the 2.182 kHZ bandwidth and the DSC (Digital Selective Calling) channel 70 on Sea area A1, The 2.187,5 kHz on Sea area A2 are used to announce the broadcasting, then the forecasts are broadcast on the announced channel. When broadcasting AVURNAV or BMS on the NAVTEX system in French, they use the 490 kHz Bandwidth.

In order to cover their very large competence areas, the CROSS situated in the Overseas Departements and Territories use INMARSAT satellite communications (Sea area A3 of GMDSS)

All these frequencies are ruled and attributed by the Agence Nationale des Fréquences (National Frequencies Office / ANFR).

MMSI assigned to the CROSS 
Dealing with a CROSS through DSC needs each station to use an MMSI.  The MMSI assigned to the coastal radiotelecommunications stations has the following structure : "00 MID - - - -".

In France,  the list of MMSI assigned to the CROSS is :

 CROSS Gris-Nez : 00 227 5100
 CROSS Jobourg : 00 227 5200
 CROSS Corsen : 00 227 5300
 CROSS Étel : 00 227 5000
 CROSS La Garde : 00 227 5400
 CROSS Antilles-Guyane : 00 227 5500
 CROSS Réunion : 00 660 1000
 MRCC Nouméa : 00 540 1000
 MRCC Papeete : 00 546 1000
 For all the coastal stations on french coasts : 00 227 0000

196 : the phone number to alert the CROS 
Like the other urgency call centers at the SAMU, the CROSS have at disposal since November 2014, an abbreviated version of urgency number, the 196. It allows people to directly get in touch with the CROSS. This free of tax number is at disposal from fix or mobile phones, on a 24/7 basis. With the 196, the CROSS can ask the mobile operator to locate the mobile phone of a person dealing with a distress at sea.

References

External links 
Les centres régionaux opérationnels de surveillance et de sauvetage (CROSS) at French Ministry of Transport website 

Installations of the French Navy
Maritime safety in France
Sea rescue organizations